Methanothermus fervidus is a species of methanogen. It is notable for being extremely thermophilic. Its cells are rod-shaped; its complex cell envelope exhibits two layers, each about 12 nm thick; the inner represents the pseudomurein sacculus and the outer a protein envelope.  The type strain is Methanothermus fervidus Stetter 1982.  The cells are motile, strictly anaerobic and stain Gram positive. They can grow at temperatures as high as 97 °C. Strain V24ST can subsist on carbon dioxide and hydrogen alone.  Its genome is 1,243,342 bp in length.

References

Further reading

External links

LPSN
Type strain of Methanothermus fervidus at BacDive -  the Bacterial Diversity Metadatabase

Euryarchaeota